There are over 9,000 Grade I listed buildings and 20,000 Grade II* listed buildings in England. This page is a list of these buildings in the borough of Halton in Cheshire.

Grade I

|}

Grade II*

|}

Notes

See also

Grade I listed buildings in Cheshire
Grade II* listed buildings in Cheshire

References

Notes

External links

Lists of Grade I listed buildings in Cheshire
Lists of Grade II* listed buildings in Cheshire
 
 
Listed buildings in the Borough of Halton